A pullstring (pull string, pull-string), pullcord (pull cord, pull-cord), or pullchain (pull-chain, pull chain) is a string, cord, or chain wound on a spring-loaded spindle that engages a mechanism when it is pulled. It is most commonly used in toys and motorized equipment. More generally and commonly, a pullstring can be any type of string, cord, rope, or chain, attached to an object in some way used to pull or mechanically manipulate part of it.

Toys

Perhaps the simplest pullstring toy is the yo-yo (c. 460 BCE). The jumping jack is a more complicated animated puppet paper doll that uses a pullstring to move its arms and legs up and down. Trompos and some spinning tops use a string that is wound around the top and then pulled to make it spin.

More recent toys include dolls, such as Chatty Cathy (1959), Charmin' Chatty (1963), Talking Tamu (1970), Look Around Crissy (1972), Sky Dancers (1994), and Sheriff Woody (from the Toy Story franchise), that have a pullstring built into them that activates a speaker when it is pulled, causing the doll to say a built-in phrase. The Blythe doll (1972) has a pullstring that changes the doll's eye color. Other non-doll toys like See 'n Say (1965).

The earliest patent with a pullstring included in it is an 1886 "Toy Bowling-Alley".

Engines

Many motorized lawn mowers, chainsaws, portable generators, and portable outboard motors use a pullstring or pullcord attached to a handle as a manual ignition device. Some vehicle engines are also started with pullchains, such as the early-1900s Puckridge, or pullcords, like the pre-release version of the Citroën 2CV car, and the DKW RT 125 scooter.

Weapons
Some grenades such as the German Models 24, 39, and 43 have pullcords. Some machine guns such as the M73 machine gun and M85 machine gun use a pullchain to charge and/or fire them.

Transport

A train's emergency brake can be a cord or chain that will stop the train when pulled. Older transit buses and trams/trolleys have a pullcord, also known as a bell cord, that a passenger can pull to signal the driver that they are requesting a stop. The Jaguar XK120 sports car's doors have no external handles so it uses an interior pullcord instead.

Other
Some types of window blinds and curtains use a cord pull to open, close, raise, and lower them. Some types of ladders like the extension ladder and attic ladder can have a pullstring that pulls it down from the ceiling. A dock plate can use a pullchain to move it. Some gates have a pullstring on its latch. A pull switch uses a chain or string to actuate a switch, commonly used in lighting and ceiling fans. Modern flush toilets use a pullchain attached to a lever that lifts the plunger to release water into the toilet bowl. The photoplayer uses pullchains to generate sound effects for silent films. Pre-1990s North American diesel locomotive train horns used a lever or pull cord to actuate an air valve. Older steam whistles were almost always actuated with a pull cord.

Some grandfather clocks have a pullchain to raise the weights in order to wind the clock's gears. A lifejacket has a pullcord used to inflate it.

Variants
A bow string is perhaps the simplest type of pullstring that pulls a bow's ends together. A ripcord is a type of pullstring used to release a parachute. A drawstring is a type of 
pullstring used in many aspects of the fashion industry and in bags as a closing device.

See also
 Bell pull
 Drawer pull
 Drawstring
 Hoist (device)
 Pull switch

References

Hardware (mechanical)
Chains